Helvetia is the female personification of Switzerland.

Helvetia may also refer to:
113390 Helvetia, an asteroid
Helvetia (band), a rock band from Seattle, Washington
Helvetia Insurance, a Swiss insurance company
Helvetia (ship, 1875), a paddle steamer that operated on Lake Zurich from 1875 to 1958
Helvetia (ship, 1964), a motor vessel that has operated on Lake Zurich since 1964
Helvetia (spider), a genus of jumping spiders
Helvetia (train), an express train formerly operated between Germany and Switzerland
Helvetia, Arizona, a ghost town
Helvetia, New Zealand, a location/hamlet near Pukekohe, New Zealand
Helvetia, Oregon
Helvetia, West Virginia
Helvetia, Wisconsin
, a United States Navy patrol vessel in commission from 1918 to 1919
Helvetia, the fictional country that the 2010 anime Sound of the Sky is set in
Helvetia Tinde, the highest peak in Peary Land, North Greenland

See also
New Helvetia, a Mexican-era California settlement
Nueva Helvecia, a city in Uruguay
Helvecia, a town in Argentina
Helvécia, a village in Hungary near Kecskemét
Helvetica (disambiguation)
Helvetii, the Celtic inhabitants of Helvetia
Switzerland in the Roman era